Dhamnod is a town and a nagar parishad in Dhar district in the state of Madhya Pradesh, India.

Demographics
In the 2001 Indian census, Dhamnod had a population of about 100,000. Males constituted 52% of the population and females 48%. Dhamnod had an average literacy rate of 78.9%, male literacy was 68% and, female literacy was 51%.

References

Cities and towns in Indore district